Wrey may also refer to:

 WREY, an AM radio station in St. Paul, Minnesota
 Wrey Gardiner (1901–1981), English writer and publisher
 Wrey baronets, a title in the Baronetage of England; including a list of people who have held the title
 John Wrey (died 1597), member of the British gentry

See also
 Wray (disambiguation)
 Ray (disambiguation)